Events in the year 2023 in France

Incumbents
President – Emmanuel Macron (REM)
Prime Minister – Élisabeth Borne (REM) 
Government – Borne government

Events

January
 11 January – Six people are injured in a knife attack at Paris's Gare du Nord train station.
 19 January – 2023 French pension reform strikes
Strikes and demonstrations begin throughout France against the government's pension reform project, which plans to raise the retirement age to 64.
 21 January – RT France, the French arm of the Russian state media network RT, ceases operation following the freezing of their bank accounts by the Direction générale du Trésor.
 25 January – France agrees to withdraw its 400 special forces from Burkina Faso, following the Saturday mandate from the ruling military junta that they withdraw within a month.
 31 January – 2023 French pension reform strikes
 A second day of strikes and demonstrations occur throughout France against the government's pension reform project, which proposes to raise the retirement age to 64. According to the CGT union, 2.8 million people took part in the protests while the Ministry of Internal Affairs counted 1.272 million protesters.
 About 25% of teachers are on strike according to the Ministry of National Education. This figure is 55% according to the teachers' union SNES-fu.

February
 7 February – 2023 French pension reform strikes
 A third day of national protests were held, attended by over 2 million strikers, 400,000 in Paris alone, according to the CGT, while the police estimate that around 757,000 strikers participated.
 11 February – 2023 French pension reform strikes
 A fourth day of national protests were held, attended by over 2.5 million strikers, 500,000 of whom were in Paris, according to the CGT, whilst the Ministry of the Interior claims that 963,000 protested.
 16 February – 2023 French pension reform strikes
 Unions said some 1.3 million people participated in strikes nationwide, with 30 percent of flights from Paris's Orly Airport being cancelled.

March
 4 March – Twenty-one people are injured in a bus crash in Corps, Auvergne-Rhône-Alpes.
 7 March – 2023 French pension reform strikes
 Trains around the country continued to be affected by strikes and protests, with 1.1 to 1.4 million people believed to have participated in over 260 protests across the country.

Predicted and scheduled events
2023 French Senate election

Deaths 
 1 January – Jacques Sereys, 94, actor (On Guard, Chouchou, Towards Zero).
 2 January – 
 Alain Acard, 71, Olympic sprint canoer (1972, 1976)
 Catherine David, 73, French-American literary critic and novelist
 François Geindre, 76, politician, mayor of Hérouville-Saint-Clair (1971–2001)
4 January – Michel Ferté, 64, racing driver.
5 January – Jean Clémentin, 98, journalist (Le Canard enchaîné), writer, and spy.
6 January –
Marc-Kanyan Case, 80, Olympic footballer (1968).
Jacques Grattarola, 92, footballer (Cannes, Saint-Étienne).
7 January –
Marcelle Engelen Faber, 99, resistance fighter.
Henri Heurtebise, 86, poet and editor.
8 January – 
Michel Laurencin, 78, academic and historian.
Christiane Papon, 98, politician, MEP (1987–1989) and deputy (1988–1993).
9 January – Max Chantal, 64, rugby league player (Villeneuve XIII, national team).
10 January – Pierre Dorsini, 88, footballer (Toulouse, Nancy).
11 January – François Roussely, 78, government official and magistrate, president of Électricité de France (1998–2004).
12 January –
Jean Laurent, 78, banker and businessman, managing director of Crédit Agricole (1999–2005).
Daniel Richard, 78, entrepreneur.
13 January –
Madeleine Attal, 101, actress and theatre director.
Fañch Peru, 82, teacher, writer and politician, mayor of Berhet (1983–2001).
14 January – Bernard Delemotte, 83, diver and cameraman.
15 January – Noël Coulet, 90, academic and historian.
16 January – Pierre Danos, 93, rugby union player (RC Toulon, AS Béziers Hérault, national team).
17 January –
Jean-Claude Marty, 79, rugby league player (FC Lézignan XIII, Racing Club Albi XIII, national team).
Lucile Randon, 118, supercentenarian, world's oldest living person (since 2022).
Paul Vecchiali, 92, film director (At the Top of the Stairs, Rosa la rose, fille publique, Once More) and author.
18 January –
Jacques Jarry, 93, linguist and archeologist.
Paul Vecchiali, 92, film director (At the Top of the Stairs, Rosa la rose, fille publique, Once More) and author.
Marcel Zanini, 99, Turkish-born French jazz musician.
19 January –
Gilles Beyer, 66, figure skater and skating coach.
Claude Guillon, 70, writer and philosopher.
20 January – Loïc Guguen, dramatic baritone.
23 January – 
Serge Laget, 66, board game designer (Mare Nostrum, Mystery of the Abbey).
Roland Weller, 84, businessman, president of RC Strasbourg Alsace (1994–1997).
24 January – Christelle Doumergue, 59, basketball player (Clermont UC, Tango Bourges Basket, national team).
25 January –
Maria Deroche, 84, Brazilian-born French architect.
Roger Louret, 72, actor, playwright, and theatre director.
26 January – Attilio Labis, 86, ballet dancer and teacher.
28 January – Gérard Caillaud, 76, actor (The Accuser, L'argent des autres, The Dogs) and stage director.
29 January – Adama Niane, 56, actor (Get In, Lupin).

See also

Country overviews
 History of France
 History of modern France
 Outline of France
 Government of France
 Politics of France
 Years in France
 Timeline of France history
 List of French films of 2023

References

 
France
France
2020s in France
Years of the 21st century in France